The Serviço de Informações de Segurança or SIS (Portuguese for: Security Information Service) is the Portuguese Intelligence and Secret Service agency founded in 1984. 

The function of SIS is to guarantee the internal security and prevent cyber attacks, sabotage, terrorism, espionage and the practice of acts which, by their nature, can change or destroy the Rule of Law as constitutionally established.

See also 
List of intelligence agencies
Sistema de Informações da República Portuguesa
PIDE

References

External links 
Official Website

Portuguese intelligence agencies